Darren Forsyth (born 21 January 1988), is an Irish footballer who plays for Warrenpoint Town in the NIFL Premiership. He plays as a forward.

Career

Early career
He moved to UCD in 2006 and received a call up to the first team in 2007. Darren started his playing career with St Josephs Boys AFC Sallynoggin before moving on to Cherry Orchard. During his time in Cherry Orchard Darren played in the Cup where they were defeated by Manchester United, Darren went on to sign for UCD when he finished his Cherry Orchard season. Darren was one of the most well known "Joeys" players of his generation. Darren also representsd his county and province in several representative teams throughout the years, he was also selected for the Irish schools team in 2006 where he received 6 caps.

College
After the Leaving Certificate Darren moved to his college team UCD on a scholarship in August 2006. He played for the under 21s, finishing as the team's top scorer in 2006. In mid-2007, he made his senior debut against Longford Town. Darren also played for the college in both the Harding Cup and the Collingwood cup, winning both. Darren scored in both finals, twice in the Harding Cup and once in the Collingwood Cup. He received the player of the tournament and top scorer award in the Harding Cup. Although he dropped out of his Arts course he continues to play for the college team becoming a professional player.

Career to date
Forsyth began his senior career at UCD. In 2007, he represented the Irish under 19s team in the Oporto Tournament in Portugal, where he received two caps against Portugal and Ukraine. He also played for the UCD under 18s team, they reached the semi final with Forsyth scoring several goals along the way. He also represented the Irish universities team. Forsyth was a leading figure for UCD's under-21 squad during the 2007 season before he broke into UCD's first team during the second half of that season. A solid 2007 season was capped off for Forsyth when he helped his UCD team to win the Under 21 League of Ireland with victory over St. Patrick's Athletic after a tense penalty shootout on 15 November 2007 in the final match held at Belfield Park.

On 28 July 2008, Darren signed for Shelbourne. He made his Shelbourne debut on 1 August 2008 against Athlone Town at Tolka Park, scoring two goals in 3–3 draw. Forsyth scored five goals in 11 appearances for Shels during the 2008 season, helping the Reds to a 2nd-place finish in the First Division. Despite initially re-signing for Shels for the 2009 season, Forsyth was released by Shelbourne on 9 February 2009 and he signed for Premier Division side. Bray Wanderers He made his Bray Wanderers debut against Shamrock Rovers on 6 March 2009 at the Carlisle Grounds.

Forsyth appeared for Gateshead in a trial against Sunderland on 18 July 2009, where he scored one of the four goals in a 4–1 victory. He also appeared, and scored, in Gateshead's 4–0 win over Durham City 3 days later. On 27 July 2009, Bray Wanderers announced Forsyth was to sign for Gateshead. He made 10 league and cup appearances in his six-month spell with Bray. After being limited to 5 appearances in 3 months at Gateshead, Forsyth joined Dunston UTS on a month-long loan at the end of October 2009, making his debut against Bedlington Terriers on 31 October 2009. Gateshead released Forsyth on 1 February 2010. Forsyth returned to Ireland following his release and he re-joined former club Shelbourne in time for their 2010 First Division campaign. After nailing down a starting XI in Shels' first team during the early stages of the 2010 season, Forysth fell out of favour at Shels and mostly played in their reserve A Championship team until his release by the club on 17 August 2010. In his second spell at Shelbourne, Forsyth made 8 league and cup appearances scoring 3 goals.

Forsyth marked a return to semi-professional football on 1 September 2014, signing an initial short-term deal at NIFL Premiership side and 2013–14 Irish Cup winners Glenavon as a replacement for emigrating forward Guy Bates. Having made five league appearances for the club, Forsyth was released by Glenavon on 2 January 2015, with Forsyth eventually joining fellow NIFL Premiership club Warrenpoint Town. Darren currently is retired from professional football and currently plays amateur for Firhouse Clover in the leinster senior league.

Honours
UCD
League of Ireland U21 Division (1): 2007

References

External links
Darren Forsyth's profile at www.shelbournefc.com
Darren Forsyth's profile at www.ucdsoccer.com

1988 births
Living people
Association footballers from County Dublin
Republic of Ireland association footballers
Bray Wanderers F.C. players
Shelbourne F.C. players
University College Dublin A.F.C. players
Gateshead F.C. players
Glenavon F.C. players
League of Ireland players
National League (English football) players
Dunston UTS F.C. players
Cherry Orchard F.C. players
Republic of Ireland men's futsal players
Association football forwards